The European Route of Cistercian Abbeys is one of the Cultural Route of the Council of Europe. Established in 2010, it is a tourist trail marked out in Europe, focusing on the European religious heritage, in particular the monasteries of the Cistercian Order. It is an international trail extending to the following countries: Belgium, Czech Republic, Denmark, France, Germany, Italy, Netherlands, Poland, Portugal, Spain, Sweden, Switzerland and United Kingdom.

The main objective of the trail is to "demonstrate the importance and significance of the Cistercian legacy".

References 

European Cultural Routes
2010 establishments in Europe
Cistercian Order